William Hair (born 1904; date of death unknown) was a Scottish professional footballer who played mainly as an outside right. During his time as a reserve player at Rangers, he was involved in a serious bus crash near to Ibrox Park, along with the team captain David Meiklejohn.

References

1904 births
Footballers from Edinburgh
Scottish footballers
Association football outside forwards
Newtongrange Star F.C. players
Broxburn United F.C. players
Bo'ness F.C. players
Rangers F.C. players
Grimsby Town F.C. players
Peebles Rovers F.C. players
Rhyl F.C. players
Flint Town United F.C. players
Leith Athletic F.C. players
English Football League players
Scottish Football League players
Scottish Junior Football Association players
Year of death missing